Ichthyosaurus (derived from Greek  meaning 'fish' and  meaning 'lizard') is a genus of ichthyosaurs from the Early Jurassic (Hettangian - Pliensbachian), with possible Late Triassic record, from Europe (Belgium, England, Germany, Switzerland, and Portugal). It is among the best known ichthyosaur genera, as it is the type genus of the order Ichthyosauria.

History of discovery
Ichthyosaurus was the first complete fossil to be discovered in the early 19th century by Mary Anning in England; the holotype of I. communis, no coll. number given, was a fairly complete specimen discovered by Mary and Joseph Anning around 1814 in Lyme Regis but was reported as lost by McGowan (1974) in his review of the latipinnate ichthyosaurs of England. The name Ichthyosaurus was first used by Charles König in 1818, but it was not used in a formal scientific description, with the earliest described ichthyosaur being Proteosaurus by James Everard Home in 1819 for a skeleton which is now attributed to Temnodontosaurus platyodon. Henry De la Beche and William Conybeare in 1821 considered Ichthyosaurus to have taxonomic priority over Proteosaurus and named the species I. communis based on BMNH 2149 (now NHMUK PV R1158), a now partially lost specimen now assigned to Temnodontosaurus that was discovered and collected between 1811-12. During the 19th century, almost all fossil ichthyosaurs were attributed to Ichthyosaurus, resulting in the genus having over 50 species by 1900. These species were subsequently moved to separate genera or synonymised with other species.

I. anningae, described in 2015 from a fossil found in the early 1980s in Dorset, England, was named after Anning. The fossil was acquired by Doncaster Museum and Art Gallery, where it was misidentified as a plaster cast. In 2008, Dean Lomax, from the University of Manchester, recognised it as genuine and worked with Judy Massare, of the State University of New York, to establish it as a new species.

Description

In comparison, other species were much smaller. Many Ichthyosaurus fossils are well-preserved and fully articulated. Some fossils still had baby specimens inside them, indicating that Ichthyosaurus was viviparous. Similar finds in the related Stenopterygius also show this. Jurassic ichthyosaurs had a fleshy dorsal fin on their back as well as a large caudal fin. Icthyosaurus is distinguished from other ichthyosaurs by having a wide forefin with 5 or more digits with an anterior digital bifurcation, but the morphology of the humerus and coracoids are also distinct from that of other Lower Jurassic ichthyosaurs, as is the arrangement of the dermal bones, though the suture lines used to diagnose these are not always visible.

Classification 
This cladogram below follows the topology from a 2010 analysis by Patrick S. Druckenmiller and Erin E. Maxwell.

Palaeobiology

Ichthyosaurus ear bones were solid, probably transferring water vibrations to the inner ear. Even so, anatomical features demonstrate that it was a visually-oriented predator; it had huge, sensitive eyes, protected by bony shields. Coprolites of Ichthyosaurus reveal that its diet consisted of fish and squid.

It was initially believed that Ichthyosaurus laid eggs on land, but fossil evidence shows that in fact the females gave birth to live young. As such, they were well-adapted to life as fully pelagic organisms (i.e. they never came onto land). The babies were born tail first to prevent them from drowning in the water.

Cultural significance 

Joseph Victor von Scheffels poem Der Ichthyosaurus describes its extinction in humouristic verses. A monument on Hohentwiel cites it as well. The poem has been translated among others by Charles Godfrey Leland
Some of the stanzas:

See also
 List of ichthyosaurs
 Timeline of ichthyosaur research

References

Ichthyosaurs of Europe
Early Jurassic ichthyosaurs
Early Jurassic reptiles of Europe
Late Triassic ichthyosaurs
Late Triassic reptiles of Europe
Fossil taxa described in 1821
Rhaetian first appearances
Taxa named by Henry De la Beche
Taxa named by William Conybeare
Early Jurassic extinctions
Ichthyosauromorph genera